"Why Can't We Be Friends?" is a song by American funk band War, from their 1975 studio album of the same name. The song has a simple structure, with the phrase "Why can't we be friends?" being sung four times after each two-line verse amounting to forty-four times in under four minutes. The song reached #6 on the Billboard Hot 100 in the summer of 1975, and uniquely features each band member singing their own verse. It was played in outer space when NASA beamed it to the linking of Soviet cosmonauts and U.S. astronauts for the Apollo–Soyuz Test Project. Billboard ranked it as the No. 23 song of that year.

Charts

Weekly charts

Year-end charts

Certifications

Smash Mouth version

American pop rock band Smash Mouth covered the song on their debut album, Fush Yu Mang, and released it as the album's third single in January 1998.

Critical reception
Larry Flick from Billboard wrote, "Hot on the heels of 'Walkin' On The Sun' comes a wonderfully festive, anthemic rendition of War's pop/R&B chestnut. The song's original funk-flavored arrangement proves perfectly accessible to Smash mouth's pop/ska style. The heartfelt 'let's get along' tone of the lyrics remains as relevant as ever to today's social and political climate, and the band's rousing approach makes the message all the more user-friendly to the pop masses. Another sure-fire multi-format hit from the album Fush Yu Mang."

Charts

References

External links
 

1975 songs
1975 singles
1998 singles
War (American band) songs
Smash Mouth songs
Anti-war songs
Songs written by Lonnie Jordan
Song recordings produced by Jerry Goldstein (producer)
Song recordings produced by Eric Valentine
Music videos directed by McG
United Artists Records singles
ABC Records singles
Interscope Records singles
Songs against racism and xenophobia
Songs about friendship